Leema Babu is an Indian actress who has appeared in Malayalam and Tamil language films.

Career
Lima made her acting debut as the younger version of Navya Nair's character in the Tamil film, Rasikkum Seemane (2010), before appearing as Bharathiraja's granddaughter in Rettaisuzhi (2010) and as Arya's sister in A. L. Vijay's period drama Madrasapattinam (2010)   before appearing in other  Tamil films including Sooraiyadal (2013). She worked on Vaanara Saenai by Saravanan Sakthi, alongside Richard, but the venture was shelved.
Leema has also appeared in supporting roles in the Malayalam films Pattam Pole "(2013) alongside Dulquer Salmaan and Money Ratnam (2014) alongside Fahadh Faasil.

Filmography

References

External links
 

Indian film actresses
Tamil actresses
Living people
Actresses from Kerala
Actresses in Tamil cinema
Actresses in Malayalam cinema
Indian child actresses
21st-century Indian actresses
Year of birth missing (living people)